The M69/M73 is a Soviet military uniform introduced in the late 1960s to replace the Gymnastyorka style uniforms, which had remained virtually unchanged since World War II. It was used by all branches of the Soviet Armed Forces aside from the Soviet Navy. Slightly modified in 1973, the uniform was produced in a wide variety of variants, and remained standard issue until finally replaced by the Afghanka uniform in the mid-1980s, though the uniform remained in use with some units well into the Soviet-Afghan War, as well as some second line units until after the fall of the Soviet Union.

Design Details 
Technically, "M69" refers to the entire line of dress and field uniforms introduced by the Soviets with their 1969 uniform regulations, though typically "M69" is used to refer to the enlisted man's field uniform.
The uniform was produced in two main versions - Summer weight, which is made from a lightweight cotton material, and was worn with the traditional Pilotka hat - and Winter weight, which is made from Wool Gaberdine, and worn with the Ushanka. The Summer uniform was worn from April to October, and the Winter uniform was worn during the intervening months. The only difference in cut between uniforms was the lack of knee reinforcements on the winter version.

Additionally, a 'tropical' or desert version of the uniform was produced for soldiers stationed in the southern regions of the USSR, made of a slightly different material. This version of the uniform also lacks the knee reinforcements, and features green felt insignia positions, similar to Shinel greatcoats. This uniform was worn with the Panamanka hat and seems to been discontinued after the mid-1970s, as examples today are rare.
Another variant is a polyester-cotton blend version of the summer uniform, made from a similar material as the US OG-507 uniform. Some Pilotkas were also made from the same material. Again, these uniforms are rare today, with most examples that turn up being dated to the mid-1970s.

Officer's M69 field Uniforms were darker in color than enlisted man's summer uniforms, and have subdued green plastic buttons. They also feature branch-of-service colored piping on the trousers, and were worn with a subdued visor cap.

Originally the uniforms were made with green plastic buttons - in 1973 these were changed to polished brass.

The M69 featured a button-up tunic, doing away with the Gymnastyorka-type tunics which had been used by the Russian army for nearly a hundred years. One possible reason for the change was the likelihood of Chemical and Nuclear Weapons being used in a possible future war with the United States and NATO - If the Gymnastyorka, which was a pull-over design, became contaminated with chemical weapons or radioactive particles, it could not be removed without pulling it over the wearer's face, which would be highly undesirable.

The uniforms were worn with shoulder boards and collar tabs, which denoted rank and branch of service (see Military ranks of the Soviet Union). These were sewn on and in full color. While the insignia was supposed to be removed while in the field, in practice this was rarely done until the start of the Soviet-Afghan War in 1979. Additionally, like all Soviet uniforms, a Podvorotnichok was sewn into the collar and changed daily by the wearer. Soldiers could also wear awards on the uniform's chest while not in the field.

History 

Following the Second World War, the Soviet Armed Forces continued to utilize the wartime M1943 Gymnastyorka uniform, until the introduction of the 1969 uniform regulations, which introduced replacements for virtually all the uniforms being used by the Soviet Armed Forces at that time, including a new Everyday/Field uniform. Although this uniform had no official name within the Soviet Military, today it is known in Military collecting circles as the M69, Obr69, or M1969, after the year of its introduction. A slight revision would come in 1973, when the uniform's green plastic buttons were changed to polished brass ones, which were more durable and had a sharper appearance.

Experience in Afghanistan showed that the M69 was not ideal for combat. It lacked deep pockets, featuring only two small pockets on the tunic and two on the trousers. The trousers themselves, which were breeches and were designed to be worn with tall Kirza jackboots, also became unpopular once more and more soldiers in Afghanistan began to acquire lace-up combat boots. As a result of these reports, a new, modern combat uniform - the Afghanka was developed. The earliest examples of the new uniform were issued to troops in Afghanistan starting in 1982, and by the late-1980s they were virtually standard among Soviet troops stationed there. However, the M69 remained standard issue to Soviet troops stationed elsewhere in the world. In 1988, the "M88" Afghanka became the standard everyday/combat uniform for both Enlisted men and Officers, replacing all versions of the M69. However, the M69 remained in widespread use and production up until the fall of the Soviet Union in 1991 - in particular the winter weight version. For a time it was common for soldiers to wear M69s while in garrison, and Afghankas while in the field. After 1991, M69s continued to be used by many of the Soviet Army's successors for several years. There is some photographic evidence of Russian troops wearing them during the First Chechen War in 1994, and some Chechen insurgents also wore them during the conflict. Today, M69s are popular collector's items.

Users

Former users

Sources 
 Soviet Uniforms and Militaria 1917–1991 by Laszlo Bekesi The Crowood Press UK (June 30, 2011), 
 Soviet and Mujahideen uniforms, clothing, and equipment in the Soviet Afghan War, 1979-1989. By Zammis Schein
 Inside the Soviet Army Today. Osprey Elite Military History Series No. 12 by Stephen J Zaloga
 Russia's War in Afghanistan by David Isby
 Warsaw Pact Ground Forces by David Rottmman
 ''2022 Russian invasion of Ukraine

Soviet military uniforms